Dr. Claire Morton is a fictional character on the television drama Peyton Place. She was portrayed by Mariette Hartley. She appeared in 30 episodes in 1965.

Character history
Claire is the daughter of Dr. Robert Morton (Kent Smith) and his wife Grace (Edith Atwater). She is married to Vincent Markham (Leslie Nielsen), a successful lawyer. She tells her parents she returned to the United States to receive an award in New York City for a paper on tropical medicine. However, she had actually left her husband. She told her parents she would visit them in Peyton Place for a while, but was actually planning on staying there permanently.

Vincent keeps on sending her letters, wondering why she has left him. However, Claire never opens them, explaining she doesn't want to have anything to do with him anymore. She decides to work as a doctor in the local hospital and meets Dr. Michael Rossi (Ed Nelson). She falls in love with him, although he is her father's biggest rival. They start dating and Michael urges her to tell her father she is legally married to Vincent. She had never told him about that, fearing he would be disappointed with her.

Michael pressures her to tell her father she is married. After she does, she announces she wants to divorce Vincent. He later travels to Peyton Place as well and demands to know why she doesn't want to be with him anymore. His health has gone downwards and Dr. Rossi confirms he is suffering from polycyclemia and has to go back to Peru immediately. Claire starts feeling guilty about divorcing a dying man and decides not to go forward with it. They eventually reunite and travel back to Peru. They are never heard from again.

Peyton Place characters
Television characters introduced in 1965